Pseudotanganikallabes is a monotypic genus of fishes belonging to the family Clariidae. The only species is Pseudotanganikallabes prognatha.

The species is found in Tanganyika Lake.

References

Clariidae
Monotypic ray-finned fish genera